Golden Princess may refer to:

 Golden Princess (ship), one of several ships
 Golden Princess (2020 film), a Burmese drama film
 Golden Princess Film Production, a Hong Kong film production company
 The Golden Princess, a 1925 American silent drama film

See also
Four Golden Princess, a China-based Malaysian musical group